Rostanga crocea is a species of sea slug, a dorid nudibranch, a marine gastropod mollusc in the family Discodorididae''.

Distribution
This species was described from Ghana.

References

Endemic fauna of Ghana
Discodorididae
Gastropods described in 2011